Gabriela Elizabeth Villagrand Leonards (born 12 January 1999), also known as Gabby Villagrand, is an American-born Panamanian footballer who plays as a midfielder for the Panama women's national team.

Career
Villagrand was homeschooled, and played for Challenge Soccer Club and HCYA Hurricanes in her youth, helping the latter to win the state championship in 2015 and 2016. In college, she joined the Angelo State Rams in 2018. She has also played for the Houston Aces of United Women's Soccer in 2019.

In 2020, she was called up to the Panama women's national team for the 2020 CONCACAF Women's Olympic Qualifying Championship. She made her international debut on 28 January 2020 against Costa Rica, coming on as a 55th minute substitute for Amarelis De Mera in the match, which finished as a 1–6 loss.

Personal life
Villagrand is from Spring, Texas, and is of Panamanian descent. She is majoring in kinesiology at Angelo State University.

See also
 List of Panama women's international footballers

References

External links
 

1999 births
Living people
People with acquired Panamanian citizenship
Panamanian women's footballers
Women's association football midfielders
Panama women's international footballers
Panamanian people of American descent
People from Spring, Texas
Sportspeople from Harris County, Texas
Soccer players from Texas
American women's soccer players
Angelo State Rams women's soccer players
American sportspeople of Panamanian descent